Acquedolci (Sicilian: Acquaduci) is an Italian town and comune in the Metropolitan City of Messina in Sicily.

Its name, that can be translated in English as "sweet waters", probably came from the fresh water springs which are part of the town territory. The inhabited centre was founded in 1922, following a landslide which damaged the town of San Fratello, forcing a large part of the population to relocate there. Acquedolci, which was a frazione of San Fratello, obtained comune status in 1969.

References

External links
 Official website 

Municipalities of the Metropolitan City of Messina
Populated places established in 1922
1922 establishments in Italy